Amir Adamovich Aduyev (born 11 May 1999) is a Russian-French football player who plays as a central midfielder for Shakhter Karagandy, on loan from Akhmat Grozny.

Early life
He was born in Ingushetia, his family immigrated to France when he was 3 years old. He holds French citizenship.

Club career
He is a product of Montpellier youth teams. In 2018–19 UEFA Youth League he scored 3 goals and provided 3 assists in 6 games for the club's Under-19 squad.

He was called up to the senior squad of Montpellier on several occasions in 2019, but remained on the bench.

On 1 October 2020, he signed a four-year contract with Russian Premier League club FC Akhmat Grozny.

He made his debut for the main squad of Akhmat on 21 October 2020 in a Russian Cup game against FC Shinnik Yaroslavl. He made his Russian Premier League debut for Akhmat on 28 November 2020 in a game against FC Lokomotiv Moscow.

On 24 February 2022, Aduyev joined Shakhter Karagandy on loan for the 2022 season.

International career
He has been called up to France U-18 squad, but did not play in any games. In early 2019, he was called up to Russia national under-21 football team and played in two friendlies.

Career statistics

References

External links
 
 

1999 births
People from Ingushetia
Russian emigrants to France
French people of Russian descent
Naturalized citizens of France
Living people
Russian footballers
French footballers
Russia under-21 international footballers
Association football midfielders
Montpellier HSC players
FC Akhmat Grozny players
FC Shakhter Karagandy players
Championnat National 2 players
Championnat National 3 players
Russian Premier League players
Russian expatriate footballers
Expatriate footballers in Kazakhstan
Russian expatriate sportspeople in Kazakhstan
French expatriate footballers
French expatriate sportspeople in Kazakhstan